David Bennent (born 9 September 1966) is a Swiss actor.

Biography
He was born in Lausanne, Switzerland. His parents are German actor Heinz Bennent and French former dancer Diane Mansart. His sister Anne Bennent is also an actress.

He has lived in Germany and France as well as Switzerland and speaks fluent German, French and English.

When he was 11 he starred in The Tin Drum, which caused much controversy because he was shown in sex scenes with an adult. At age 19, he starred as Honeythorn Gump in the film Legend, co-starring with Tom Cruise and Mia Sara.

Bennent has appeared in such plays as Peer Gynt (2004), Die Juden (2003), Michael Kramer (2003), and A Midsummer Night's Dream (2002).

Selected filmography
 The Tin Drum (1979)
 Dog Day (1984)
 Legend (1985)
 She Hate Me (2004)
 Ulzhan (2007)
 Michael Kohlhaas (2013)
 Fog in August (2016)
 Happy as Lazzaro (2018)

Television
Derrick – Season 12, Episode 5: "Wer erschoß Asmy?" (1985)
Tatort – Väterchen Frost (2019)

Bibliography
 Holmstrom, John. The Moving Picture Boy: An International Encyclopaedia from 1895 to 1995. Norwich, Michael Russell, 1996, p. 362.

References

External links

1966 births
Living people
People from Lausanne
Swiss male child actors
Swiss male stage actors
Swiss male film actors
Swiss male television actors
20th-century Swiss male actors
21st-century Swiss male actors
Swiss people of German descent
Swiss people of French descent